The list of ship commissionings in 1968 includes a chronological list of all ships commissioned in 1968.


See also 

1968
 Ship commissionings